Oscar Acosta may refer to:
 Oscar Zeta Acosta (1935–1974), American attorney, politician, novelist and activist
 Oscar Acosta (baseball) (1957–2006), American baseball player and pitching coach
 Oscar Román Acosta (born 1964), Argentine football midfielder
 Oscar Acosta (Honduran writer), Honduran writer